ঢাকা সিলেট হাইওয়ের উপর অবস্থিত সিলেটের সবচেয়ে বড় স্থানীয় বাজার। গোয়ালাবাজারকে ব্যাংকের শহরও বলা হয়।

See also
 List of villages in Bangladesh

Unions of Osmani Nagar Upazila